Amblyrhynchotes rufopunctatus is a species of pufferfish in the family Tetraodontidae. It has been reported only from the South China Sea, and it is of uncertain status, with FishBase and the Catalogue of Life both stating that confirmation work is required to determine its existence as a species.

References 

Tetraodontidae
Fish described in 1962
Taxa named by Li Sizhong (ichthyologist)